A clamshell is a one-piece container consisting of two halves joined by a hinge area which allows the structure to come together to close.  Clamshells can be made to be reusable and reclosable or can be sealed securely.

Origin 

Clear plastic clamshell containers were invented by Driscoll’s, a California berry grower, in the 1990’s to pack its berries for retail sale.

Construction
Clamshell containers can be made of a variety of materials. Plastics such as polystyrene, polyester, PVC, foam sheets, etc. The material can be made by thermoforming or can be injection molded into the desired shapes. A single piece of material is used for the top and bottom with a "living hinge" that is integral to the material, rather than added separately.

Folding cartons made of paperboard or molded pulp can also be of a clamshell shape. It can also be made of cellulose fiber such as sugarcane-bagasse, wheatstraw, wood pulp, etc.

Closing
Clamshells can use a variety of means of closing or sealing. Some have self-locking tabs, snaps, or have a friction fit. Others use adhesive, pressure-sensitive tape, labels, staples, or are heat-sealed.

Opening
Many clamshell containers are easy to open, and reuse, by consumers.  When plastic clamshell containers are securely heat sealed, they are tamper resistant and deter package pilferage.

These security packages are intentionally difficult to open, sometimes requiring customers to use scissors or a knife. 

Difficulty opening such packaging can be frustrating to the point of wrap rage. Some people injure themselves trying to open security packaging which in the United Kingdom has been cited as the most frustrating to open.

See also
Foam food container
Solander box
Living hinge

Notes

References

 Soroka, W, "Fundamentals of Packaging Technology", IoPP, 2002, 
 Yam, K. L., "Encyclopedia of Packaging Technology", John Wiley & Sons, 2009, 

Containers
Food storage containers